Materials for the Arts is a program of the New York City Department of Cultural Affairs that provides free "new and gently used donated supplies to artists, nonprofit groups, and public schools." Its current Executive Director is Harriet Taub.

Established in 1979 by artist Angela Fremont, it was described by The New York Times as "like a Kmart reimagined as Pee-wee's Big Adventure." Located in a 25,000-square-foot warehouse in Long Island City, its shelves are "stocked with things like toaster ovens, rugs, theater curtains, yarn, paint and toothbrushes." Considered to be one of the largest reuse centers in the country, the program redistributes more than $6 million in supplies a year, gathering "donations from fashion houses, television production companies and big-name corporations like Estée Lauder." According to its website, the program also removes "hundreds of tons from the waste stream every year and [keeps it] out of landfills, which helps sustain our environment, promote reuse, and reduce waste."

External links
 Official link on NYC.gov

Notes

Government of New York City
Environmental organizations based in New York City
Environmental justice in New York City